Carache is an island in the northwestern part of the Bissagos Islands group, Guinea-Bissau. It belongs to the Bolama Region and the sector of Caravela. Its area is 80.4 km², the island is 18.7 km long and 7.3 km wide. It is separated from the island of Caravela by a narrow channel. The largest villages on the island are Binte and Ampintcha. Its population is 428 (2009 census).

References

Bissagos Islands
Bolama Region